Erica Funkhouser is an American poet.

She graduated from Vassar College with a BA and from Stanford University with a MA. She teaches at the Massachusetts Institute of Technology.

Her work appeared in The Atlantic Monthly, The New Yorker, The Paris Review, Ploughshares, and Poetry.  She lives in Essex, Massachusetts.

Awards
2007 Guggenheim fellowship

Works
Post & Rail, University of Washington Press, 2018
"Imaginary Friends", AGNI 66, 2006
"Day Work", Beatrice, 15 March 2008
"Love Poem with Harbor View", Poetry Foundation
Earthly, Houghton Mifflin Harcourt, 2008, 
 Pursuit, Houghton Mifflin, 2002, 
The actual world, Houghton Mifflin, 1997, 
 Sure Shot and Other Poems, Houghton Mifflin, 1992
 Natural Affinities, A. James Books, 1983,

Anthologies
"My Father's Lunch", Good Poems for Hard Times, Editor Garrison Keillor, Penguin Group, 2006, 
"The Women Who Clean Fish", Working classics: poems on industrial life, Editors Peter Oresick, Nicholas Coles, University of Illinois Press, 1990, 
"Lilies", Poetry from Sojourner: a feminist anthology, Editors Ruth Lepson, Lynne Yamaguchi Fletcher University of Illinois Press, 2004,

Non-fiction
Lewis & Clark: the journey of the Corps of Discovery, an illustrated history, Authors Dayton Duncan, Ken Burns, William Least Heat Moon, Stephen E. Ambrose, Erica Funkhouser, Knopf, 1997,

References

External links
"Erica Funkhouser Interview"
"www.ericafunkhouser.com"

Vassar College alumni
Stanford University alumni
MIT School of Humanities, Arts, and Social Sciences faculty
Living people
Year of birth missing (living people)
American women poets
21st-century American women